Satej Dnyandeo Patil alias Bunty (born 12 April 1972) is a Member of the Maharashtra Legislative Council from the Indian National Congress.He  served as the Minister of State for Home (Urban), Housing, Transport, Information Technology, Parliamentary Affairs.He previously served as Minister of State for Home (Urban & Rural), Rural Development, Food & Drugs Administration of Maharashtra in the UPA coalition government from 2010 to 2014...Like many of his contemporaries, Patil also followed his father Dr. D. Y. Patil in politics. Patil hails from the city of Kolhapur.

Early life and family 
Patil is the son of  D Y Patil who is the former Governor of Bihar state in eastern India. Patil studied at Shivaji University in Kolhapur. He was an average student but  was active in the University student politics. He was elected as Chairman of Shivaji University Student Council, Kolhapur in 1992-93. Patil started his career in public service when he was elected to the Kolhapur District Central  cooperative Bank, 2001 as a Director from Gaganbawada Taluka, Kolhapur. Satej is married to Pratima (daughter of Vijaykumar Govindrao Patil). They have two children, Tejas and Devashree. Satej's brother, Dr. Sanjay Patil is the President of D.Y. Patil Group.

Political career
Patil was elected to the Legislative Assembly as an independent candidate in the elections held in October 2004 and won with a margin of more than 42 thousand votes. He was again elected in the State Assembly Elections 2009. He lost to Amal Mahadik in State Assembly Elections 2014. In Maharashtra Legislative Council Elections 2015, Satej Patil won the MLC seat by defeating the last three terms sitting MLC Mahadevrao Mahadik.

Non-political positions held
He is the President of Shree Mouni Vidyapeeth, Gargoti, Kolhapur. He is Vice President of D. Y. Patil Education Society, Pune & Kolhapur and Kolhapur District Amateur Boxing Association, Kolhapur. Also, he is Chairman of Padmashree Dr. D. Y. Patil Sahakari Sakhar Karkhana Ltd., Gaganbavada, Kolhapur and ex Chairman of Shivaji University Students Council, Kolhapur (1992–93). He is Director of Kolhapur District Central Co-Op. Bank Ltd., Kolhapur and Kolhapur Chamber of Commerce & Industries, Kolhapur. Also he is member of many committees and organisations. He is President of Kolhapur District Basketball Association.

References

External links 
Official Website

1972 births
Living people
Maharashtra MLAs 2009–2014
Shivaji University alumni
Indian National Congress politicians